Dipoloceras is a rather evolute, strongly ribbed and well keeled acanthocerataean ammonite from the Albian stage of the Lower Cretaceous included in the brancoceratid subfamily Mojsisovicziinae. The whorl section is typically inflated or depressed. Ribs are high standing, may be sharp, close to wide spaced. The ventral keel may sit below the level of the ribs.

Dipoloceras is similar to but distinct from  Oxytropidoceras in that Oxytropidoceras has a compressed whorl section, high standing keel and lower ribs. Both have more or less typical ammonitic sutures.

References
Arkell et al, Mesozoic Ammonoidea, Treatise on Invertebrate Paleontology, Part L  (Ammonoidea). Geol Soc of Amer. and Univ Kans press. 1957
Ryszard Marcinowski and Jost Wiedmann. The Albian Ammonites of Poland. Palaeontologia Polonica no. 50, 1990
Description of Dipoloceras 

see also illustrations of
Dipoloceras cristatum ,  
 

Ammonitida genera
Acanthoceratoidea
Cretaceous ammonites